The Russia men's national field hockey team represents Russia in international field hockey competitions.

In response to the 2022 Russian invasion of Ukraine, the FIH banned Russia from the 2022 Women's FIH Hockey Junior World Cup, and banned Russian and Belarusian officials from FIH events. In addition, the European Hockey Federation banned the participation of all Russian athletes and officials from all events sanctioned by the Federation.

Tournament record
Russia has never qualified for the World Cup or the Summer Olympics. They have competed four times in the EuroHockey Championship where their best result was the seventh place in 2011.

European Championships

Hockey World League

Current squad
Squad for the 2021 Men's EuroHockey Nations Championship.

Head coach: Vladimir Konkin

See also
Russia women's national field hockey team
Soviet Union men's national field hockey team

References

External links

FIH profile

European men's national field hockey teams
national team
Men's sport in Russia
field hockey